Puerto Rico Highway 939 (PR-939) is a road located in Maunabo, Puerto Rico. This highway extends from PR-760 in downtown Maunabo to Quebrada Arenas.

Major intersections

See also

 List of highways numbered 939

References

939
Maunabo, Puerto Rico